J. T. Tom West (1954 – 28 September 2006) was a Nigerian Nollywood actor, known for Otondo, Laviva and Born 2 Suffer. He died on 28 September 2006 in Lagos, Nigeria.

Early life 
He was born in Port Harcourt, River State in 1954 and grew up in Lagos, Nigeria.

Career 
He rose to fame after acting in the blockbuster movie State Of Emergency directed by Teco Benson.

Tom West has acted on various blockbusters movies in Hollywood that include; Above the law, The Captor, Gang Paradise.

Filmography 
 Laviva (2007)
 Dangerous Return (2006)
 Fears (2006)
 Fears 2 (2006)
 Liberian Girl (2006)
 The Captor (2006)
 The Captor 2 (2006)
 The Break Out (2005)
 The Break Out 2 (2006)
 I Believe in You (2004)
 I Believe in You 2 (2004)
 Into Temptation (2004)
 Lake of Fire (2004)
 My Own Share (2004)
 My Own Share 2 (2004)
 Otondo (2004)
 Shattered Illusion (2004)
 Shattered Illusion 2 (2004)
 State of Emergency (2004)
 State of Emergency 2 (2004)
 The Substitute (2003)
 Last Weekend (2003)
 Last Weekend 2 (2003)
 Moving Train (2003)
 Oyato (2003)
 Oyato 2 (2003)
 Born 2 Suffer (2002)
 Gangster Paradise (2001)
 She Devil (2001)
The Price (1999)

Death 

J.T Tom West died on September 28, 2006, in a horrifying car accident in Lagos.
His body was welcomed at the Integrated Cultural Centre on Thursday, October 26, 2006, by dignitaries including members of the Actors Guild of Nigeria (AGN), officials, friends, and family.
The two-phase singing service that followed was the next activity. As J.T. Tom West was allegedly a devoted Christian, the first aspect was solely a Christian concern.

References

Living people
21st-century Nigerian actors
Nigerian male film actors
1954 births
2006 deaths